Kate Berner is an American political advisor who serves as a White House deputy communications director in the Biden administration.

Early life and education 
A native of Hastings-on-Hudson, New York, Berner graduated from Hastings High School. She earned a Bachelor of Arts degree from the University of Chicago.

Career 
Berner was previously a vice president at SKDK. During the Obama administration, Berner was the director of outreach and in the Office of the Vice President of the United States and special advisor in the United States Department of Commerce. She also worked as a spokeswoman for the Obama Foundation. Berner was deputy director of communications for the Joe Biden 2020 presidential campaign, where she managed campaign messaging.

References 

Biden administration personnel
Obama administration personnel
Living people
People from New York (state)
United States Department of Commerce officials
University of Chicago alumni
Year of birth missing (living people)